North is a 1960 novel by the French writer Louis-Ferdinand Céline. The story is based on Céline's escape from France to Denmark after the invasion of Normandy, after he had been associated with the Vichy regime. It is the second published part, although chronologically the first, in a trilogy about these experiences; it was preceded by Castle to Castle from 1957, and followed by Rigadoon, published posthumously in 1969. It was the last book Céline published during his lifetime.

Publication
The book was published in 1960 through Éditions Gallimard. In the first edition, some of the characters have the same names as the real people who inspired them. Because of this, Céline was sued for defamation, and in subsequent editions all characters have fictional names.

Legacy

It was also adapted into a graphic novel by Paul Brizzi and Gaëtan Brizzi, along with Céline's other novels Castle to Castle and Rigadoon.

See also
 1960 in literature
 20th-century French literature

References
Notes

Bibliography

External links

1960 novels
Novels by Louis-Ferdinand Céline
French autobiographical novels
Novels set during World War II
Éditions Gallimard books
Novels adapted into comics